Just 4 Kicks is a direct-to-video 2003 film starring Dylan and Cole Sprouse as Dylan and Cole Martin and Tom Arnold as their father and coach.

Synopsis
The plot concerns identical twin brothers who love soccer, but whose team plays badly. When the twins' dad, who's also the coach of their team, has to go away on a business trip, the twins' mother acts as the coach until their dad comes back. Unfortunately, she's not as good at soccer as her husband is, and the twins' soccer team soon starts getting made fun of for having a woman as their coach. In response, the twins set out to find a different coach for their soccer team.

They find that a local mechanic named Rudy, who saves them from getting run over by a car, is an excellent soccer player, and want him to help their mom coach their soccer team. It later turns that "Rudy" is actually George Patrick Owens, a famous professional soccer player from Ireland. With George helping the twins' mom coach the team, they and their soccer team embark on the road to a championship for their local soccer league (which they do end up winning).

Cast 
 Cole Sprouse as Cole Martin
 Dylan Sprouse as Dylan Martin
 Wesley Singerman as Sal 
 Lori Sebourn as Louise 
 Jenna Gering as Rudy

References

External links 
 

2003 films
American association football films
2000s sports comedy films
American sports comedy films
2003 comedy films
American direct-to-video films
Twins in fiction
2000s English-language films
2000s American films